NCEM may refer to:

 National Center for Electron Microscopy, Berkeley, California.
 National Centre for Early Music York, Britain.